York Cemetery is the name of several cemeteries:

York Cemetery, Toronto, Ontario, Canada
York Cemetery, York, England
York Cemetery, New Delhi, India